Darrell Eugene Elston (born August 15, 1952) is a retired American professional basketball player. Born in Tipton, Indiana, he was a 6'4" (193 cm) 190 lb (86 kg) guard and played collegiately at the University of North Carolina.

Elston was selected with the 7th pick of the third round in the 1974 NBA draft by the Atlanta Hawks. He was also selected in the fourth round of the 1974 American Basketball Association draft by the Carolina Cougars. He played for the Virginia Squires in 1974–75, playing 72 games and averaging 8.3 points, 2.3 rebounds and 2.8 assists per game. On August 18, 1976, the former ABA's Indiana Pacers signed Elston in their first move since their absorption into the NBA. In 1976–77, Elston played 5 games for the Pacers, averaging 1.0 point, 1.2 rebounds and 0.4 assists per game. He was waived not long after.

His son Derek spent four seasons on the Indiana Hoosiers men's basketball team, including the 2013 Big Ten Championship team. Derek averaged 4.3 points and 2.9 rebounds per game as a Hoosier.

Notes

External links
NBA stats @ basketballreference.com

1952 births
Living people
American men's basketball players
Atlanta Hawks draft picks
Basketball players from Indiana
Indiana Pacers players
North Carolina Tar Heels men's basketball players
People from Tipton, Indiana
Shooting guards
Virginia Squires players